Gracie Gallegos is the current mayor of Pico Rivera, California, United States.

Gallegos was elected to the Pico Rivera City Council in 2007 and was appointed as the mayor in 2009. She has also served as co-chair of the Pico Rivera Planning Commission and chairperson of the Pico Rivera Community Resources Advisory Commission. Gracie is a member of various committees and boards such as the Gateway Cities Council of Governments and the National Association of Latino Elected and Appointed Officials.

Gallegos is the mother of actress Gracie Rae Gallegos, and is a member of the California Teachers Association and serves on the parent council for Loyola Marymount University.

References

External links
Official Pico Rivera website profile

Living people
Mayors of places in California
Women mayors of places in California
People from Pico Rivera, California
Year of birth missing (living people)
Mayors of Pico Rivera, California
Hispanic and Latino American mayors in California
Hispanic and Latino American politicians
Hispanic and Latino American women in politics
21st-century American women